Bob Kuhn is a former mayor of Glendora, California.

Kuhn was elected to the Glendora City Council in 1986 and was the city's mayor in 1990, 1993, and 1994. He also served as a Planning Commissioner from 1982 to 1986.

Kuhn also owns an independent insurance agency in Glendora.

References

Mayors of Glendora, California
Living people
Year of birth missing (living people)